Edmeston can refer to:

People
William Edmeston (18th century), British officer in French and Indian War, brother of Robert
Robert Edmeston (18th century), British officer in French and Indian War, brother of William
James Edmeston (1791–1867), English architect, surveyor, and hymn writer
Newton Edmeston (20th century),  Mayor of Fort William, Ontario 1922–1925

Places
Edmeston, New York, town in Otsego County, New York, USA
Edmeston (CDP), New York, community in the town of Edmeston
West Edmeston, New York, community in the town of Edmeston
South Edmeston, New York, community in the town of Edmeston

Companies
Edmeston AB, Swedish engineering company belonging to the Sandvik Group